Iffezheim is a town in the district of Rastatt in Baden-Württemberg in Germany. It lies close to the Rhine river, where the Lock Iffezheim is also situated. Iffezheim is also known for the horse races, which takes place three times a year.

Politics

Mayors

Jakob Huber (1891–1893)
Konrad Mußler (1893–1911)
Johannes N. Huber (1911–1919)
Anton Oesterle (1920–1932)
Friedrich König (1932–1939)
Heinrich Hertweck (1939–1945)
Franz Xaver Huber (1945–1961)
Albin König (1961–1978)
Otto Himpel (1978–2002)
Peter Werler (2002-2018)
Christian Schmid (since 2018)

Civil parish
Results of the Kommunalwahl from 13 June 2004:

CDU: 44.8% (6 seats)
FWG: 33.0% (5 seats)
SPD: 22.2% (3 seats)

Twin cities

Iffezheim is twinned with:

 Dahlwitz-Hoppegarten, Germany
 Mondolfo, Italy

Coat of arms
The current coat of arms, which was already used in the 16th century, shows an inverted black anchor with a red rudder on a white ground. It's the official seal of Iffezheim since the 19th century. In the meantime a so-called Wolfsangel was in use.

References

External links

Rastatt (district)